The 2018 Royal Bernard Drome Classic was the 6th edition of La Drôme Classic road cycling one day race. It was part of UCI Europe Tour in category 1.1.

Teams
Twenty-two teams were invited to take part in the race. These included five UCI World Tour teams, thirteen UCI Professional Continental teams, three UCI Continental teams and one national team.

General classification

External links

References

2018 UCI Europe Tour
2018 in French sport
La Drôme Classic